Stictea coriariae is a species of moth of the family Tortricidae. It is found in China (Henan, Fujian, Hubei, Hunan, Guangdong, Guangxi, Guizhou, Gansu, Sichuan), Russia and Japan.

The wingspan is 15–18 mm.

The larvae feed on Eucalyptus robusta, Melaeuca leucadendra, Melaeuca quinqueneruia, Tristania conferta, Fristania conferta, Rhodomytus tomentosa and Coriaria japonica.

Subspecies
Stictea coriariae coriariae (Japan, China: Henan, Fujian, Hubei, Hunan, Guangdong, Guangxi, Guizhou, Gansu)
Stictea coriariae grisescens Kuznetsov, 1979 (Russia, China: Sichuan)

References

Moths described in 1974
Eucosmini